QPC may refer to:
 Quantum point contact, in physics
 The Quarter Pounder with Cheese, a McDonald's menu item
 Queens Park Centre, in England
 Queen's Privy Council for Canada
 QueryPerformanceCounter, an API for the High Precision Event Timer, a hardware timer used in personal computers

 Quaid e azam public college, in Gujranwala Pakistan